Avinger High School or Avinger School is a public high school located in Avinger, Texas (USA) and classified as a 1A school by the UIL. It is part of the Avinger Independent School District located in southwest Cass County. In 2015, the school was rated "Met Standard" by the Texas Education Agency.

Athletics
The Avinger Indians compete in these sports - 

Baseball
Basketball
Cross Country
Golf
Tennis
Track and Field

State Titles
Boys Basketball 
1977(1A), 1996(1A), 2016(1A)
Boys Track-
2006 Tyris Dowell

References

External links
Avinger ISD

Public high schools in Texas
Schools in Cass County, Texas
Education in Cass County, Texas
Buildings and structures in Cass County, Texas
Educational institutions in the United States with year of establishment missing
Public middle schools in Texas
Public elementary schools in Texas